The Battle of Busan of 1592 (or more accurately, the Battle of Busanpo or Battle of Busan Bay) (釜山浦 海戰) was a naval bombardment of anchored Japanese ships at Busan. Yi Sun-sin managed to destroy over 100 Japanese ships and retreated with minimal casualties. It was a naval engagement that took place on 1 September 1592 during the first phase of the Japanese invasions of Korea. It was a Korean surprise attack on the fleet of Toyotomi Hideyoshi stationed at Busan, and its main objective was to recapture Busan, which would thoroughly cutoff the supply line of the Japanese army. In this battle, officer Jung Un and six soldiers died, the Japanese lost over 100 ships, and the Japanese military lost control of the seas around the Joseon.

Background
After commander Yi Sun Shin's fleet decisively defeated the Japanese in the Battle of Hansando on July 8, the Japanese had to change their war strategy. Their strategy was to deliver more land forces and supplies by sea to the northern part of the Korean peninsula and then they would march into Ming China. With the failure of this strategy, Japanese troops in the northern provinces of Joseon Korea had to suffer from starvation and shortages of supplies. To invade China, they needed to secure war supply routes. The alternate plan was to advance troops and supplies by roads, but this route was blocked by the Uibyeong ("Righteous Army").  Many Korean civilians and Buddhist monks formed a voluntary army and attacked Japanese troops.

Formation of the united Joseon fleet
After the Battle of Hansan Island, in which commander Yi Sun-sin's navy won against the Japanese navy around mid-July, they remained silent for nearly a month. In mid-August Japanese Kato Yoshiaki's army, Kimura's army, and Okamoto's army retreated from Hanyang, the later capital of the Joseon dynasty, to Gyeongsang Province. Around this time, most of the Japanese troops retreated to Gimhae to secure their munitions. In addition, following the Battle of Hansan Island, the Japanese navy retreated to Busan and focused on protecting and rebuilding their positions. Commander Yi sent spy ships to Busan port and found out there were about 470 warships there. Commander Yi believed that the Japanese were retreating to their country, so Gyeongsang Province Governor (慶尙右水營) Kim Soo requested that Commander Yi block their sea route. Therefore, Commander Yi with Commanders Won Gyun and Yi Eok Ki united their fleets, for a total of 166 vessels. On their way to Busan, Commander Yi defeated 24 Japanese ships at Seopyeongpo (西平浦), at the Battle of Dadaejin (多大浦), and at Jeolyoungdo (絶影島).  The combined Joseon fleet defeated the Japanese navy repeatedly, largely as a result of their well-trained sailors and the Joseon ships' medium- and long-range cannons.

Battle of Busanpo
Off the coast of Busan, the united Joseon fleet realized that the Japanese navy had readied their ships for battle, and the Japanese army had stationed themselves around the shoreline. The united Joseon fleet assembled in the Jangsajin (長蛇陣), or "Long Snake" formation, with many ships advancing in a line, and attacked straight into the Japanese fleet. Overwhelmed by the Joseon fleet, the Japanese navy abandoned their ships and fled to the coast where their army was stationed. The Japanese army and navy joined their forces and attacked the Joseon fleet from the nearby hills in desperation. The Joseon fleet shot arrows from their ships to defend and restrict their attacks and, in the meantime, concentrated on their cannon fire on destroying Japanese vessels. The Korean ships fired on the Japanese fleet and burned them using fire arrows while the Japanese fired on them from above in their forts. Even with cannons captured at Busan, the Japanese did little damage to the Korean warships. By the time the day had ended, 128 Japanese ships had been destroyed. Yi Sun-sin gave orders to withdraw, ending the battle.

Comparisons
In terms of size, the Joseon ships were one-third that of Japanese ships. Although commander Yi destroyed over 100 ships, he did not order his soldiers to pursue the Japanese on shore, probably because he recognized that close hand-to-hand combat skills of the Joseon were significantly weaker than those of the samurai. In addition, the Joseon soldiers were exhausted from long sea travel and battle, and would have been heavily outnumbered on land. Up to that point, Commander Yi had not fought with numbers of soldiers, but rather with ships and cannons. Yi reinforced disadvantages in number of soldiers with heavy use of firearms. The Japanese also had a well-trained cavalry, which was another aspect the Joseon army lacked. In the Joseon fleet, Yi lost one of his cherished officers, by the name of Woon.

Impact
Yi Sun Shin originally intended to destroy all the remaining Japanese ships, however, he realized that doing so would effectively trap the Japanese soldiers on the Korean Peninsula, where they would travel inland and slaughter the natives. Therefore, Yi left a small number of Japanese ships unharmed and withdrew his navy to resupply. And just as Yi suspected, under the cover of darkness, the remaining Japanese soldiers boarded their remaining ships and retreated.

After this battle, the Japanese forces lost the control of the sea. The devastating blow dealt to the Japanese fleet isolated their armies in Korea and cut them off from their home bases. Since the Japanese forces realized the importance of the defensive lines of Busan Bay to secure the supply line, they tried to bring the west area of Busan under their control, when the Joseon navy came. This attempt led to the Battle of Jinju in October 1592, in which General Kim Si-min triumphed over 20,000 Japanese troops, and the Siege of Jinju in June 1593, in which Japanese forces finally captured the castle in Jinju.

Arguments about the result of the battle 
Korean, Japanese, British, and American historians say that the Joseon navy won this battle and the Japanese military lost control of the seas around the Joseon. Chester W. Nimitz also referred to the battle as a Joseon decisive victory and resulted in the Japanese military losing control of the seas.

On the other hand, Netto-uyoku(Japanese Internet rightists) argued that the result was a strategic victory of Japan (that is, the Japanese forces succeeded in protecting control of the Busan bay, which also led to a protected supply line between the Bay and Japan), with references to the official history of the Joseon and referencing the military mails between Japanese Daimyo.

For example, Annals of the Joseon Dynasty, which is one the official history record summarized this battle as strategic failure as follows,
"李舜臣等攻釜山賊屯, 不克。 倭兵屢敗於水戰, 聚據釜山、東萊, 列艦守港。 舜臣與元均悉舟師進攻, 賊斂兵不戰, 登高放丸, 水兵不能下陸, 乃燒空船四百餘艘而退。 鹿島萬戶鄭運居前力戰, 中丸死, 舜臣痛惜之。".
This can be translated as follows,
"Yi Sun Shin and his fleet attacked Busan where the enemy forces stationed, but failed to defeat them. Since Japanese soldiers were often defeated in sea fights,
they gathered in the fortress in Busan and Dongnae, which guarded the naval ships. Yi Sun Shin and Won Gyun attacked the Busan bay on vast numbers of ships, but the Japanese soldiers did not fight, and climbed to higher position and shot an arquebus. Thus Josen marines were unable to land then after burning 400 empty
ships, Yi's fleet retreated. 鹿島萬戶 Chong Woon(ko) was shot and died during the hard fighting, and Yi Sun deeply regret the lost."

However, in dozens of the sources like Joseon's official compendium(李忠武公全書) which is also the primary historical source written by the bureaucrats of the Korean government, Nanjung ilgi, military reports (which were written by on-scene commander in Busan on the spot), British history books, and American history books, it was recorded as the Korean navy decisively defeating the Japanese navy.

Chester W. Nimitz who played a major role in the naval history of World War II as Commander in Chief, U.S. Pacific Fleet, and Commander in Chief, Pacific Ocean Areas, commanding Allied air, land, and sea forces during World War II described the battle like this:

 In a later engagement more than seventy Japanese vessels, including warships and transports were encountered by the Allied fleet and were sunk. The devastating blow which has been dealt to the Japanese fleet has isolated the enemy armies in Korea and has cut them off from their home bases. The naval action, which stretched over a period of several days, was broken off in the mid-summer of the year 1592. The naval forces were under the command of the Korean Admiral Yi Sun-sin. 

James B. Lewis who is the University Lecturer at the University of Oxford described the battle like this:
It is important in the history of Joseon's naval warfare, since it was the only sea battle, out of the ten fought during the year, in which Joseon attacked the Japanese naval base with relatively inferior fire power. In spite of the loss of Chong Woon, one of Yi's staff who was shot during the battle, Yi achieved an enormous victory in sinking over 100 ships in this one battle alone. As winter crept in, the two parties found naval operations impossible and rode at anchor for the duration of the season.
 
Samuel Hawley, an American historian trained at Queen's University, earning BA and MA degrees, described the battle like this:
The Korean navy's attack on Busan had been astonishingly successful. It had destroyed fully a quarter of the Japanese fleet at a cost of just five men killed, twenty-five wounded, and no ships lost.

Even the books which were published by the Japanese Governor-General of Korea and Japanese historian the during Empire of Japan era also summarized this battle as a Korean decisive victory. Furthermore, the modern Japanese historians also said the battle was a Korean victory.

See also
 Siege of Busan
 List of naval battles
 Military history of Korea
 Military history of Japan
 Yi Sun Sin
 Imjin War

References

Bibliography

 
 
 
 
 
 
 
 
 
 
 桑田忠親 [Kuwata, Tadachika], ed., 舊參謀本部編纂, [Kyu Sanbo Honbu], 朝鮮の役 [Chousen no Eki]　(日本の戰史 [Nihon no Senshi] Vol. 5), 1965.
 
 
 
 
 
 
 
 
 
 
 
 
  
 
 
 
 
 
 

1592 in Asia
1592 in Japan
Busan 1592
Pusan 1592
South Gyeongsang Province
History of Busan
Yi Sun-sin